The following highways are numbered 189:

Japan
 Japan National Route 189

United States
 Interstate 189
 U.S. Route 189
 Alabama State Route 189
 Arizona State Route 189
 California State Route 189
 Connecticut Route 189
 Florida State Road 189
 Georgia State Route 189
 K-189 (Kansas highway)
 Kentucky Route 189
 Maine State Route 189
 Maryland Route 189
 Massachusetts Route 189
 M-189 (Michigan highway)
 New Mexico State Road 189
 New York State Route 189
 Ohio State Route 189
 Pennsylvania Route 189 (former)
 Tennessee State Route 189
 Texas State Highway 189 (former)
 Ranch to Market Road 189 (Texas)
 Utah State Route 189 (former)
 Virginia State Route 189
 Wisconsin Highway 189 (former)

Territories:
 Puerto Rico Highway 189